The 2011–12 Saint Joseph's Hawks basketball team represented Saint Joseph's University during the 2011–12 NCAA Division I men's basketball season. The Hawks, led by 17th year head coach Phil Martelli, played their home games at Hagan Arena and are members of the Atlantic 10 Conference. They finished the season 20–14, 9–7 in A-10 to finish in a four-way tie for fifth place. They lost in the quarterfinals of the A-10 Basketball tournament to St. Bonaventure. They were invited to the 2012 National Invitation Tournament where they lost in the first round to Northern Iowa.

Roster

Schedule

|-
!colspan=9| Regular season

|-
!colspan=9| 2012 Atlantic 10 men's basketball tournament

|-
!colspan=9| 2012 NIT

References

Saint Joseph's Hawks men's basketball seasons
Saint Joseph's
Saint Joseph's